is a former Japanese football player.

Club statistics

References

External links

1981 births
Living people
Fukuoka University alumni
Association football people from Fukuoka Prefecture
Japanese footballers
J2 League players
Sagan Tosu players
Association football forwards